Grevillea divaricata is a species of flowering plant in the family Proteaceae and is endemic to central New South Wales. It is a low shrub with linear leaves and small clusters of flowers on the ends of branchlets. It is only known from the type specimen.

Description
The upper surface of the leaves is rough to the touch. The flowers are probably red or red and cream-coloured. Flowering was recorded in April.

This grevillea is similar to G. rosmarinifolia but has spreading (rather than erect) leaves, rough (rather than mostly smooth) leaves, and sometimes forms a lignotuber (never present with G. rosmarinifolia).

Taxonomy
Grevillea divaricata was first formally described in 1830 by Robert Brown in the Supplementum primum prodromi florae Novae Hollandiae from specimens collected by Allan Cunningham in mountains north of Bathurst in 1823. The specific epithet (divaricata) means "widely spreading".

Distribution and habitat
Grevillea divaricata is only known from the type location north of Bathurst where it grew in open forest.

Conservation status
This grevillea is listed as "endangered" under the New South Wales Government Biodiversity Conservation Act 2016.

References

divaricata
Proteales of Australia
Flora of New South Wales
Plants described in 1830
Taxa named by Robert Brown (botanist, born 1773)